Ghayasuddin Pathan was a Member of the 1st National Assembly of Pakistan as a representative of East Pakistan.

Career
Pathan was a Member of the Constituent Assembly of Pakistan. He served as the State Minister of Finance. Following the dismissal of the cabinet led by Khawaja Nizamuddin, he was appointed the State Minister of Agriculture, Minority Affairs, and Parliamentary Affairs in the cabinet of Chaudhry Muhammad Ali.

References

Pakistani MNAs 1947–1954
Living people
Year of birth missing (living people)
Members of the Constituent Assembly of Pakistan